Ottniel Baartman (born 18 March 1993) is a South African cricketer. He made his first-class debut for South Western Districts in the 2014–15 Sunfoil 3-Day Cup on 22 January 2015. In September 2018, he was named in Northern Cape's squad for the 2018 Africa T20 Cup. In September 2019, he was named in Northern Cape's squad for the 2019–20 CSA Provincial T20 Cup.

In January 2021, Baartman was named in South Africa's Test squad for their series against Pakistan. However, later the same month, he was ruled out of the tour due to a medical reason. In April 2021, he was named in KwaZulu-Natal's squad, ahead of the 2021–22 cricket season in South Africa.

References

External links
 

1993 births
Living people
South African cricketers
Northern Cape cricketers
South Western Districts cricketers
People from Oudtshoorn
Cricketers from the Western Cape